Charlton Keith (born May 4, 1982) is a former American football linebacker. He was signed by the Cleveland Browns as an undrafted free agent in 2006. He played college football at Kansas.

Keith was also a member of Cleveland Browns, Oakland Raiders, Hamilton Tiger-Cats and New York Sentinels.

Early years
Keith attended Buchtel High School in Akron, Ohio where he lettered in football and basketball.

College career
Keith played college football with the University of Minnesota, Minnesota West Community College and the University of Kansas.

Professional career

Cleveland Browns
Undrafted in the 2006 NFL Draft, Keith signed with the Cleveland Browns on May 2 only to be released on May 5. He was signed to the Browns practice squad on October 25 where he spent the remainder of the 2006 season.

Oakland Raiders
In 2007, he was signed by the Oakland Raiders but was cut before the start of training camp.

Hamilton Tiger-Cats
Keith was signed by the Hamilton Tiger-Cats on September 12, 2007. The team re-signed him on April 24, 2008. He was released on July 21, 2008.

References

External links
Just Sports Stats
Hamilton Tiger-Cats bio
Kansas Jayhawks bio
United Football League bio

1982 births
Living people
Players of American football from Akron, Ohio
American football linebackers
Kansas Jayhawks football players
American players of Canadian football
Canadian football linebackers
Hamilton Tiger-Cats players
New York Sentinels players